This is a list of ecoregions in the Cook Islands.

Terrestrial ecoregions
 Central Polynesian tropical moist forests
 Cook Islands tropical moist forests

Marine ecoregions
 Eastern Indo-Pacific realm
 Central Polynesia province
 Phoenix Islands/Tokelau/Northern Cook Islands
 Southeast Polynesia province
 Southern Cook Islands/Austral Islands

References

Ecoregions of the Cook Islands
Cook Islands
Cook Islands-related lists